Mónica De La Cruz (born November 11, 1974) is an American politician and insurance agent from the state of Texas. She has represented  in the U.S. House of Representatives since 2023. De La Cruz is the first Republican to represent Texas's 15th congressional district since its creation in 1903.

Early life and career
De La Cruz graduated from James Pace Early College High School in Brownsville, Texas, and the University of Texas at San Antonio, studying marketing. She later attended the National Autonomous University of Mexico in Mexico City, studying Spanish. She interned for Turner Entertainment before working for Cartoon Network Latin America. She is an insurance agent and business owner and resides in the Rio Grande Valley, where she grew up.

U.S House of Representatives

Elections

2020 

2022 

De La Cruz defeated Democratic nominee Michelle Vallejo in the general election. When she took office in 2023, she became only the eighth person to represent this district since its creation in 1903, and the first Republican. By a matter of a few months, she was the second Republican elected from a Rio Grande Valley in over a century; the first, Mayra Flores, was elected to a partial term in a neighboring district in 2022. De la Cruz is the first Republican elected to a full term in this area in modern times.

Caucus memberships 
 Republican Main Street Partnership

Committee assignment
 Committee on Financial Services
Subcommittee on Financial Institutions and Monetary Policy

Personal life
De La Cruz has been married twice and has two children. Her husband, Juan Gabriel Hernandez, filed for divorce in Hidalgo County District Court in 2021. He sought a restraining order against De La Cruz, alleging that she was physically and verbally abusive to her stepdaughter through divorce proceedings. De La Cruz denied the allegations. De La Cruz is an Episcopalian.

See also

List of Hispanic and Latino Americans in the United States Congress

References

External links
 Congresswoman Monica De La Cruz official U.S. House website
 Monica De La Cruz for Congress campaign website
 
 

|-

1974 births
American Episcopalians
American politicians of Mexican descent
Businesspeople from Texas
Christians from Texas
Episcopalians from Texas
Female members of the United States House of Representatives
Hispanic and Latino American members of the United States Congress
Hispanic and Latino American people in Texas politics
Hispanic and Latino American women in politics
Insurance agents
Latino conservatism in the United States
Living people
Protestants from Texas
Republican Party members of the United States House of Representatives from Texas
Texas Republicans
University of Texas at San Antonio alumni
Women in Texas politics